Warda or WARDA may also mean:

Warda (name), list of people with the name
Warda, Texas, an unincorporated area of Texas settled and inhabited by the Wendish.
West Africa Rice Development Association, an agricultural research centre based in Bouaké, Côte d'Ivoire
Wardha, Maharashtra, India